Sir William John Anthony Timpson CBE (born 24 March 1943) is a British businessman, the chairman and owner of Timpson, a UK shoe repair chain with over 2000 shops.

Early life and career
Timpson was born in 1943, and educated at Oundle School and the University of Nottingham. He began his professional career as a management trainee at Clarks, before moving on to become a shoe buyer for his family's business, William Timpson Ltd., in 1965. He was appointed a director of Timpson in 1968, and remained with the company after his father Anthony was ousted as chairman five years later, at which point it was acquired for £28,600,000 by United Drapery Stores. After leading a management buyout, Timpson was himself installed as the firm's chairman in 1985.

Timpson now has a weekly management column in The Daily Telegraph and has written several books about his management style. According to The Sunday Times Rich List in 2019, he is worth £210 million.

Politics
During the EU referendum in 2016, Timpson gave his public support for leaving the EU and stated that it is "a risk worth taking".

Personal life
Timpson lives in Cheshire. Together with his wife Alex, who died on 5 January 2016, he had three children, adopted two more, and fostered another 90.

His youngest son, Edward Timpson, is the MP for Eddisbury in Cheshire, and was previously MP for Crewe and Nantwich, also in Cheshire.

Timpson is an avid Manchester City supporter.

He was appointed Commander of the Order of the British Empire (CBE) in the 2004 Birthday Honours for services to the retail sector, and was knighted in the 2017 Birthday Honours for services to business and fostering.

Timpson's late aunt, Dame Kathleen Ollerenshaw, who died in 2014 aged 101, was a former Lord Mayor of Manchester, a Freeman of the City and a mathematician, and has been described as "one of the most distinguished Mancunians of her era."

Publications
 High Street Heroes: The Story of British Retail in 50 People, Icon Books (2015)
 Ask John: Straight-talking, common sense from the front line of management; Paperback, Icon Books (2014)
 Upside Down Management, John Wiley & Sons (2010)
 How to Ride a Giraffe, Caspian Publishing (2008)
 Dear James: Secrets of Success from a Management Maverick, Caspian Publishing (2000)

References

1943 births
British chief executives
Living people
People educated at Oundle School
Alumni of the University of Nottingham
Commanders of the Order of the British Empire
British Eurosceptics
Knights Bachelor
Businesspeople awarded knighthoods